Barbara Rafferty (born 15 January 1950 in Clydebank), is a Scottish actress. Credited as Barbara Ann Brown in her early acting career. She is known for her roles as Ella Cotter in the long-running BBC Two sitcom Rab C Nesbitt, then firstly as Shirley Henderson and currently as Bernie O'Hara in BBC Scotland soap opera River City. Also as Agnes Meldon in mystery series Hamish MacBeth and as Grandma Mainland in the CBeebies comedy Katie Morag.

Career
Rafferty is best known for playing Ella Cotter in Rab C Nesbitt between 1990 and 1999, and then again from 2008 - 2011 when the show made a comeback. Rab C Nesbitt made a comeback for a special Episode in 2014. Other notable television roles include playing pub landlady Agnes Meldrum in Hamish Macbeth and Alice MacAllister in The Young Person's Guide To Becoming A Rock Star. She took over the role of Alice Taylor from Muriel Romanes in Take The High Road in 1988. Also, in the 2006 film The Last King of Scotland, Barbara Rafferty starred as Mrs. Garrigan.
Until 2009 she was appearing in the BBC Scotland soap River City as Shirley Henderson and since 2018 as Bernie O'Hara.

Barbara's daughter, Amy Rafferty (born 1972), is a singer, songwriter, and musician with the cult Glasgow music collective The Recovery Club.

Her son, Bob Rafferty, fronts the well known Glasgow alternative rock band El Dog.

In 2013 it was announced that Rafferty would join the cast of His Majesty's Theatre in Aberdeen Pantomime Cinderella with her friend Elaine C. Smith.

She portrayed Grandma Mainland in the CBeebies TV series, Katie Morag. It started airing on 3 November 2013.

Filmography
{| class="wikitable plainrowheaders sortable"
|-
! colspan="4" scope="col"| Film
|-
! scope="col" | Title
! scope="col" | Year
! scope="col" | Role
! scope="col" | Notes
|-
! scope="row" | The Wicker Man
| 
| 
| 
|-
! scope="row" | The Slab Boys
| 
| 
|
|-
! scope="row" | The Acid House
| 
|  
| 
|-
! scope="row" | Women Talking Dirty
| 
| 
| 
|-
! scope="row" | The Last King of Scotland
| 
| 
|
|-
! scope="row" | Sir Billi the Vet
| 
| 
| 
|-
! scope="row" | Perfect Sense
| 
| 
|
|-
! scope="row" | Fast Romance
| 
| 
| 
|-
! scope="row" | Sir Billi
| 
| 
| 
|-
! scope="row" | The Legend of Barney Thomson
| 
| 
|
|-
! colspan="4" scope="col"| Television
|-
! scope="col" | Title
! scope="col" | Year
! scope="col" | Role
! scope="col" | Notes
|-
! scope="row" | Tutti Frutti
| 
| 
| Mini-series; Episode 3: "Gin a Body, Dig a Body"
|-
! scope="row" | Taggart
| 
| 
| 
|-
! scope="row" | Take the High Road
| 
| 
| 
|-
! scope="row" | Your Cheatin' Heart
| 
| 
| 
|-
! scope="row" | Doctor Finlay
| 
| 
| 
|-
! scope="row" | Go Now
| 
| 
| 
|-
! scope="row" | The Tales of Para Handy
| 
| 
| 
|-
! scope="row" | Hamish Macbeth
| 
| 
| 
|-
! scope="row" | The Young Person's Guide to Becoming a Rock Star
| 
| 
| 
|-
! scope="row" | Life Support"
| 
| 
| 
|-
! scope="row" | Tinsel Town| 
| 
| 
|-
! scope="row" | Murder Rooms: The Dark Beginnings of Sherlock Holmes| 
| 
| 
|-
! scope="row" | Rockface| 
| 
| 
|-
! scope="row" | Captain Abercromby| 
| 
| 
|-
! scope="row" | Heartbeat| 
| 
| 
|-
! scope="row" | Sea of Souls| 
| 
| 
|-
! scope="row" | River City| 
| 
| 
|-
! scope="row" | No Holds Bard| 
| 
| 
|-
! scope="row" | Garrow's Law| 
| 
| 
|-
! scope="row" | Doctors| 
| 
| 
|-
! scope="row" | Doctors| 
| 
| 
|-
! scope="row" | Rab C. Nesbitt| 
| 
| 
|-
! scope="row" | The Sunny| 
| 
| 
|-
! scope="row" | Katie Morag| 
| 
| 
|-
! scope="row" | Still Game| 
| 
| 
|-
! scope="row" | River City| 
| 
| 
|}

Other appearances
 California Sunshine as Jessica (2014; short film)
 Missing as Rachel (2007; short film)
 Autumn Leaves'' as Mrs. McBride (1997; short film)

References

External links 
 River City official site
 
 River City, Shirley Henderson Character page

Living people
Scottish television actresses
Scottish soap opera actresses
Scottish film actresses
Actresses from Glasgow
1954 births
Scottish voice actresses
20th-century Scottish actresses
21st-century Scottish actresses